The Higer Longwei is a midsize pickup manufactured by Chinese automotive brand Higer. Higer is a brand under Higer Bus, a subsidiary of the King Long Group, which is the largest bus maker in China.

Overview
Launched in March 2015, the Higer Longwei midsize pickup is available with two engine options, including a 2.4 liter four-cylinder petrol engine producing 136hp and 200nm of torque, and a 2.8 liter four-cylinder turbo-diesel engine producing 102hp and 220nm of torque, both either mated to a five-speed manual gearbox or a five-speed automatic gearbox. The standard layout is rear wheel drive, and four-wheel drive is optional. Prices of the Higer Longwei starts at 81,800 yuan and ends at 101,800 yuan ($13,184 – 16,407) at launch. As of 2019, the Higer Longwei midsize pickup has a price range of 72,800 yuan to 165,800 yuan.

The Higer Longwei is also rebadged as the Shaanxi Tongjia Longrui (龙锐) sold under the Shaanxi Automobile Group.

Controversy
Since its production, controversy has arisen due to the front fascia design of the Higer Longwei bearing a likeness to the twelfth generation Ford F-150, making it an unlicensed clone.

References

External links
  (Higer)

Pickup trucks
Rear-wheel-drive vehicles
Trucks of China
2010s cars